The Plaza is a high-rise commercial and  residential building on Beach Road in Kallang, Singapore. The complex consists of a 30-storey residential and commercial tower and an 8-storey building housing The Plaza Parkroyal hotel. One of the Poshest residential in the center of the central, Arab street, Bugis and marina skyline facing .

The tower has a distinctive triangular prism design, with each face being concave.

Embassy of Zimbabwe is located on the 13th floor of The Plaza whereas the Honorary Consulate of Belarus can be found on the 16th floor of the building.

History
The Plaza complex was completed in 1979.

References

Residential skyscrapers in Singapore
Skyscraper office buildings in Singapore
Hotels in Singapore
Buildings and structures completed in 1979
1979 establishments in Singapore
Kallang
20th-century architecture in Singapore